Mula may refer to:

Places
 Mula, Iran, a village in Mazandaran Province, Iran
 Mula, Maldives, an island in the Maldives
 Mula, Spain, a town in the autonomous community of Murcia, Spain
 Muľa, a village and municipality in southern Slovakia
 Mula, Malta or Ħal-Mula, a village in Malta near Żebbuġ, Malta
 Mula, Aguas Buenas, Puerto Rico, a barrio

Rivers
 Mula River (India), a river in India
 Mula River (Pakistan), a river in Pakistan
 Mula (Spain), a river in Spain

People 
 MULA (2015), Dominican female band
 Avni Mula (born 1928), Albanian singer, composer and musician
 Blerim Mula (born 1958), football manager and former player
 Çun Mula (1818–1896), Albanian freedom fighter
 Frank Mula (1950–2021), American television writer
 Inva Mula (born 1963), Albanian opera singer
Volodymyr Mula (born 1989), Ukrainian journalist

Other uses
 Mula (nakshatra), a Lunar mansion in Hindu astrology
 "Mula" (song), a song by Big Sean featuring French Montana
 Mula, a drum used in Cuban music
 Mula (Tyagi), a clan of Muslim Tyagi of Moradabad district in India and provinces of Pakistan

See also 
 Mulla (disambiguation)
 Moola (disambiguation)
 Mullah, a title for an Islamic scholar
 Mulah, an island in the Maldives